Redwell Wood is a  biological Site of Special Scientific Interest near South Mimms in Hertfordshire. The local planning authority is Welwyn Hatfield District Council.

The site has ancient and secondary woodland, heath and scrub. The woodland canopy is dominated by pedunculate oak. Ground flora include bluebells and enchanter’s-nightshade, while heathland species include heather and the rare creeping willow.

There is access from Blackhorse Lane.

See also
List of Sites of Special Scientific Interest in Hertfordshire

References

Sites of Special Scientific Interest in Hertfordshire
Welwyn Hatfield
Forests and woodlands of Hertfordshire